The Crater Highlands (Ngorongoro Highlands) are a geological region along the East African Rift in the Arusha Region and parts of northern Manyara Region in north Tanzania.

Geology
The highlands are located in a spreading zone at the intersection of branches of two tectonic plates, the African Plate and Somali Plate, resulting in distinctive and prominent landforms.

The highlands are named for the many craters and calderas present. As is common in spreading zones, volcanoes can be found here. Magma, rising to fill the gaps, reaches the surface and builds cones. Calderas form if a volcano explodes or collapses, following the emptying of the magma chamber below, and further spreading can fracture the volcanoes as well.

Geography
The following are considered to be within the Crater Highlands:

 Ela Naibori Crater
 Gelai Mountain
 Kitumbeine Mountain
 Lake Eyasi
 Meto Hills
 Mount Loolmalasin
 Ngorongoro Crater

Visiting the Crater Highlands
There are variety of scenic walks and hikes requiring various fitness levels, as well as trips to the famous Ngorongoro Crater, as well as visits to local villages.

See also

References

Geography of Arusha Region
Geography of Manyara Region
Geology of Tanzania
Great Rift Valley
Highlands
Landforms of Tanzania
Volcanoes of Tanzania